The Countdown is the fifth studio album by American jazz pianist Mulgrew Miller. The album was released in 1988 by Landmark Records.  For this record Miller teamed with Ron Carter on bass, Joe Henderson on tenor sax, and Tony Williams on drums. Initially, the album contained seven compositions, but later it was re-released with the bonus track "1684".

Reception

Scott Yanow of Allmusic noted that the album "is a particularly strong all-star date, teaming the pianist with tenor saxophonist Joe Henderson (who sits out on two of the seven numbers), bassist Ron Carter and drummer Tony Williams. Other than a surprisingly effective 'What the World Needs Now Is Love', the repertoire is composed of originals by Miller (four) and one apiece from Williams and Henderson ('Tetragon'). A high-quality advanced hard bop set."

Track listing

Personnel
Musicians
Ron Carter – bass
Joe Henderson – tenor sax
Mulgrew Miller – piano
Tony Williams – drums

Production
Phil Bray – photography
Phil Carroll – art direction
George Horn – mastering
Orrin Keepnews – liner notes, producer
Danny Kopelson – engineering, remixing

References

1988 albums
Landmark Records albums
Albums produced by Orrin Keepnews
Mulgrew Miller albums